Daniel Hall may refer to:
 Daniel Hall (comics), a fictional character in the Sandman comics
 Daniel Hall (poet) (born 1952), American poet
 Daniel Hall (West Virginia politician) (born 1974), American state Senator and former Delegate in West Virginia
 Daniel Hall (Wisconsin politician) (1819–?), member and Speaker of the Wisconsin State Assembly
 Daniel Hall (publisher), American publisher and author
 Alfred Daniel Hall (1864–1942), sometimes known as Sir Daniel Hall, British agriculturalist
 Danny Hall (footballer) (born 1983), English footballer (Oldham Athletic, Shrewsbury, Gretna, Chesterfield)
 Danny Hall (baseball) (born 1954), baseball coach
 Danny Hall (drummer) (born 1981), British drummer
 Danny Hall (cricketer) (born 1944), cricketer 
 Danny Hall (field hockey) (born 1974), member of the England national field hockey team
 Dan Hall (musician) (born 1978), Australian musician
 Dan Hall (politician) (born 1952), American politician and former member of the Minnesota State Senate
 Dan Hall (soccer) (born 1999), Australian-born soccer player